Himantopterus nobuyukii is a moth in the family Himantopteridae. It was described by Yasunori Kishida and Toshio Inomata in 1993. It is found on Borneo.

References

Moths described in 1993
Himantopteridae